&pizza (pronounced "And Pizza") is an American fast casual pizza restaurant chain, with 36 locations in Washington, D.C., Maryland, Virginia, New York, New Jersey, Pennsylvania and Florida. The restaurant sells personal and customizable oblong-shaped pizzas. They tailor each location to its neighborhood, with local artists designing the interiors. Some locations serve beer, wine, and cocktails.

History
&pizza (originally called H&pizza) was founded by Michael Lastoria and Steve Salis, with the first shop opening in July 2012 on H Street in Northeast, Washington, D.C. Salis served as CEO from inception until 2015.  Currently, Lastoria serves as CEO and creative director. In 2016, the restaurant received a $25 million investment from AVALT, to expand into New York City, opening its first location there in June 2017. In July 2017, &pizza and the bakery Milk Bar announced a joint venture, to open in Harvard Square in Cambridge, Massachusetts. In October 2017, &pizza announced funding from RSE Ventures.

The restaurant has advocated in Congress for a $15 minimum wage by 2023.

Customer service
In 2023, an employee of &pizza violently assaulted a customer at their U Street location minutes before the store closed. The customer, a single mom, had her phone snatched and was beaten with a baseball bat when she tried to retrieve it. Following the incident, the employee was arrested and &pizza's CEO said he was "deeply sorry".

Reception
The Washington Post called the restaurant "the pizza shop for the 21st century", describing it as "Chipotle for pizza". It was named best pizza in the Washington City Paper Best of D.C. in 2017; was #12 on the Restaurant Business 2017 Future 50 list of fastest-growing small concept restaurants; and was on the Fast Company World's Most Innovative Companies 2018 list.

Marketing
Since 2015, the restaurant has held an annual Pi Day tradition, where they hold weddings in their pizza shops, offering free pizza, cake, alcohol, officiants and photography. In 2018, &pizza hosted over a dozen weddings at locations in DC, Baltimore, New York, and Philadelphia. For employees who want it, the restaurant pays for them to get a tattoo of its ampersand logo. The advocacy group Our Harvard Square has criticized &pizza for encouraging tattoos of its logo on employees and for referring to employees as "tribe members".

The restaurant chain filed a trademark dispute against @pizza, a UK-based chain. In 2020, the claim for trespassing and copyright infringement was dismissed after a three year court battle involving the District Court and the Court of Appeals for the D.C. Circuit.

See also
 List of pizza chains of the United States

References

External links
 

Fast casual restaurants
Regional restaurant chains in the United States
2012 establishments in Washington, D.C.
Pizza franchises
Pizza chains of the United States
Economy of the Eastern United States
Restaurants established in 2012
American companies established in 2012